This is an incomplete list of national mayors (bourgmestres) of Bukavu, in Sud-Kivu, DR Congo since the Independence, 1960.

List
 Denis Maganga Igomokelo 1961-1964
 François Matabaro 1964-1967
 Daniel Birimwiragi 1967-1968
 Floribert Sukadi Bulayi 1968-1970
 Grégoire Sedei Sekimonyo 1970-1971
 Gilbert Kibibi wa Lukinda Umo 1971-1974
 Mosha Kayembe Dibwa 1974
 André Lokomba Kumuadeboni 1974-1979
 M'lemvo wa Maduda Yeka 1979-1981
 André Lokomba Kumuadeboni 1981-1982
 Me Nyaloka zizi Mata-Ebongo 1982-1984
 Ndala wa Ndala 1984-1986
 Shango Okitedinga Lumbahe 1986-1988
 Shemisi Betitwa 1988-1991
 Jules Walumona Kyembwa 1991-1996
 Migale mwene Malibu 1991-1996
 Thaddée Mutware Binyonyo 1996-2000
 Roger Safari  
 Adolphe Cirimwami
 Mathieu Ruguye  
 Prospère Mushobekwa
 Mme Nzita Kavungirwa Kayange, circa 2008
 Guillaume Bonga Laisi
 Philemon Lotombo Yogolelo, circa 2012-present

See also
 Bukavu history and timeline	

 
bukavu